The 2020 Shpageeza Cricket League was the seventh edition of the Shpageeza Cricket League, a professional Twenty20 cricket (T20) league established by the Afghanistan Cricket Board (ACB) in 2013, and the third edition to have official T20 status. Following a request to the Ministry of Public Health due to the COVID-19 pandemic, the tournament was given approval in July 2020 to take place. The ACB also confirmed that it was their priority to run a successful tournament.

The tournament was originally scheduled to take place from 13 to 25 September 2020, with the matches being played at the Kabul International Cricket Stadium. However, the tournament was moved forward by one week, to avoid clashing with the 2020 Indian Premier League (IPL), which itself had been delayed due to the COVID-19 pandemic. Six teams took part in the tournament, and the Mis Ainak Knights were the defending champions.

On 20 August 2020, a players' draft took place ahead of the tournament. The ACB also stated that all Afghan players taking part in the 2020 Caribbean Premier League (CPL) should return to Afghanistan before the CPL is due to conclude, so they can be available to play in the Shpageeza Cricket League. However, after talks with the President of Cricket West Indies, it was decided that these players could finish the CPL before returning, while the players with IPL contracts would miss the tournament completely.

The opening match of the tournament saw the Mis Ainak Knights beat the Band-e-Amir Dragons by one run, with the Knights managing to defend 13 runs from the final over of the game.

The Kabul Eagles, Mis Ainak Knights, Band-e-Amir Dragons and Boost Defenders finished in the top four places in the group stage to progress to the knockout phase of the tournament. In the first qualifier, the Kabul Eagles beat the Mis Ainak Knights by four wickets. Therefore, the Eagles progressed directly to the final, with the Knights moving to the second qualifier match. In the eliminator match, the Band-e-Amir Dragons beat the Boost Defenders by 76 runs to join the Knights in the second qualifier match. The second qualifier saw the Mis Ainak Knights beat the Band-e-Amir Dragons by five wickets, to join the Kabul Eagles in the final. In the final, the Kabul Eagles beat Mis Ainak Knights by nine runs to win the tournament.

Points table

Fixtures

Knockout-stage

References

External links
 Series home at ESPN Cricinfo

Shpageeza Cricket League
Shpageeza Cricket League
Shpageeza Cricket League